Willa Was Here is the debut and to-date only studio album by American pop singer Willa Ford, released on July 17, 2001 in the United States on the former Atlantic imprint Lava Records. The album debuted and peaked at number fifty-six on the Billboard 200 chart. It spawned the top twenty-five hit single "I Wanna Be Bad", which sold over 250,000 copies, as well as "Did Ya' Understand That", which failed to chart. The album also contained a hyperlink to the video for "I Wanna Be Bad". "Ooh Ooh" was released as a promotional single, but failed to chart as well. Ford co-wrote nine of the twelve tracks.

Track listing

Sample credits
"Somebody Take the Pain Away" contains an interpolation of "Here Comes the Rain Again" by Eurythmics.

Personnel
Willa Ford - vocals, background vocals
 Joshua M. Schwartz - multiple instruments
Brian Kierulf - multiple instruments
Eve Nelson - keyboards
Masa Shimizu - guitar
Robin Daniels - percussion
Andy Marvel - keyboards
Gerry Leonard - guitar
Jen Carr - background vocals
Sabelle Breer - background vocals
Tim Kelley - keyboards, drums, bass
Bob Robinson - guitar, piano
Michael Nigro - keyboards
Royce Da 5'9 - vocals

Production
Producers: Josh Schwartz, Brian Kierulf, Michael D. Goodman (aka Sheppard), Kenny Gioia, Eve Nelson, Andy Marvel, Robert D. Fusari, Tim Kelley, Bob Robinson, Howie Hirsh, Robbie Nevil, Scott Ialacci, Anthony Acid
Executive producer: Willa Ford, Jason Flom, Andy Shane
Management: DAS Communications, Ltd.
Engineers: Eve Nelson, Tim Kelley, Bob Robinson, Stephen George, Kenny Gioia
Assistant engineers: Benjamin Jelen
Vocal engineers: Stephen George
Mix engineers: Manny Marriquin
Mixing: Rob Chiarelli, Michael D. Goodman, Kenny Gioia, Eve Nelson, Andy Marvel, Jim "Bonzai" Caruso, Robert D. Fusari, Bill Lee
Mixing assistants: Jay Nichlas
Mastering: Tom Coyne
A&R direction: Jason Flom, Andy Shane
A&R administration: Gregg Nadel
Programming: Josh Schwartz, Brian Kierulf, Eve Nelson, Andy Marvel, Robert D. Fusari, Falonte Moore, Tim Kelley
Drum programming: Kenny Gioia, Eve Nelson
Keyboard Programming: Darius Rustam
Pro Tools whiz: Alan Friedman
Vocal Production Effect: Cynthia Daniels
Arrangers: Andy Marvel
Vocal arrangement: Willa Ford, Jen Carr, Sabelle Breer
String arrangements: Josh Schwartz

Charts

References

2001 debut albums
Willa Ford albums
Atlantic Records albums
Lava Records albums